"Cut Your Teeth" is a song by British singer Kyla La Grange. It was released as the first single for her second studio album of the same name. A pre-release of the album itself, the song released on 24 January 2014 has charted in a number of European charts, notably in Denmark, Netherlands, Sweden and Switzerland.

Track listings

Charts

Weekly charts

Year-end charts

Certifications

References

2014 singles
2014 songs
Kygo songs